Vammen is a village in Viborg Municipality in central Jutland, Denmark. Vammen Church, which still has its original walls, has a history going back to the Romanesque period. As of 1 January 2022, Vammen has a population of 544.

Notable people 
 Sophie Zahrtmann (1841 in Vammen – 1925) a Danish deaconess and nurse; became Sister Superior of the Danish Deaconess Institute

References

External links
Vammen local website (in Danish)

Towns and settlements in Viborg Municipality
Viborg Municipality